David Bitsindou (born 26 March 1989 in France) is a French footballer who now plays for US Fontenay in his home country.

Career

Bitsindou started his senior career with US Chantilly. After that, he played for ÉDS Montluçon, Levski Elin Pelin, Etar 1924 Veliko Tarnovo, US Fontenay, and Southall. In 2014, he signed for Palloseura Kemi Kings in the Finnish Veikkausliiga, where he made eighty-four appearances and scored three goals.

References

External links 
 David Bitsindou: "I met a reindeer pretty close by car"
 David Bitsindou: "If the coach comes to see me play, I wouldn't disappoint him" 
 Veikkausliiga Profile 
 Foot National Profile 
 Sportal.bg Profile

Montluçon Football players
FC Etar 1924 Veliko Tarnovo players
Southall F.C. players
Kemi City F.C. players
TP-47 players
French footballers
1989 births
Living people
Association football defenders